The Sifton Ranges are a mountain range along the west side of the Rocky Mountain Trench in northern British Columbia, Canada. It has an area of 1823 km2 and is a subrange of the Cassiar Mountains which in turn form part of the Interior Mountains.

Sub-ranges
Cormier Range
Ruby Range

References

Cassiar Mountains
Northern Interior of British Columbia